is a traditional Japanese artform of making braids and cords.

History
 braids were first created by using fingerloop braiding to weave different yarns together.

In the present day, modern variations of  weaving discs exist, typically made of firm, dense foam with roughly 32 notches around the edge, creating the tension necessary for weaving . These discs are considered to be a more affordable and portable alternative to a traditional , with many different sizes and shapes of disc available for purchase.

However, a modern foam  disc is also considered less versatile than a traditional , as the weaver is constrained to using no more than 32 different yarns, with their thickness predetermined by the width of the notch.  also allow the weaver to create braids that are flat, four sided or hollow in nature, though rectangular or square foam  discs, allowing the weaver to create a flat braid, do exist.

Related terms
  – a class of patterns for round cord all involving eight threads folded in half for a total of sixteen strands. In clockwise order, each bobbin is moved to the opposite side. When different combinations of thread color are used, many interesting patterns emerge, including diagonal stripes, diamonds on a background, triangles resembling hearts, and tiny six-petalled flowers.
  or  – the frame for the braiding;  Japanese for "round stand".
 , decorative cords used to decorate objects such as  envelopes.  
  – bobbins. True silk is a hollow fiber with a rough surface that resists slipping past the loop unless gently pulled. For synthetic fibers, a flexible plastic "clamshell" bobbin may be preferable.

See also

 
 Braiding
 
 
 
 Spool knitting
 Macramé
 
 Chinese knotting
 Chinese button knot
 Frog (fastening)

External links
 Talzhemir's introductory handouts, in .PDF format, including Kongo Gumi and a pattern for a notched cardboard wheel
 Instructions with diagrams
 Eight strand hollow braid over a core

Braids
Japanese folk art
Japanese words and phrases
Japanese weaving techniques
Ropework
Decorative ropework